Schenkelia is a genus of jumping spiders that was first described by R. de Lessert in 1927.

Species
 it contains four species, found only in Africa and Sri Lanka:
Schenkelia benoiti Wanless & Clark, 1975 – Ivory Coast
Schenkelia ibadanensis Wesolowska & Russell-Smith, 2011 – Nigeria
Schenkelia lesserti Berland & Millot, 1941 – Guinea
Schenkelia modesta Lessert, 1927 (type) – Africa

References

Salticidae genera
Salticidae
Spiders of Africa